German heavy metal band Bonfire has released several video albums throughout their career.

The Best (1993)

The Best is a compilation video released by Bonfire in 1993 which contained all the band's promotional videos from 1986 to 1993. It also includes footage of the band during recording sessions and tours. This package was released alongside the band's Live... The Best album. By the time it was released, Claus Lessmann had already been replaced with Michael Bormann.

Golden Bullets (2001)

Golden Bullets is a compilation video released by German hard rock band Bonfire in 2001. It contains most of the footage from the band's VHS release The Best but excludes the sections "L.A. (Bonfire in Hollywood)" and "Bonfire Recording Session - Point Blank". Included in this DVD package is a live performance at Wacken 1998, Hans Ziller and Claus Lessmann giving an introduction to the videos from 1986 to 1993, and a new video for the song "Under Blue Skies".

One Acoustic Night (2005)

One Acoustic Night is a live video released by Bonfire in 2005. It was a two disc set, the first featured the band playing an acoustic live set and the second featured extra material.

Double Vision (2007)

Double Vision is a live video released by German hard rock band Bonfire in 2007. It was recorded live at Firefest III in Nottingham, United Kingdom. Aside from the concert, addition footage of the band's videos from the 1980s, behind-the-scenes stuff, and three songs performed at Rockpalast are included.

The Räuber – Live (2009)

The Räuber – Live is a video released by German heavy metal band Bonfire in 2009. It features two discs, the first having the entire rock opera performance of The Räuber while the second one has a behind-the-scenes look at the opera rehearsals and a new updated music video for You Make Me Feel. The rock opera is performed entirely in German with English only being in the songs as they are performed.

References

Bonfire
 Video